Jeff Galfer (born October 18, 1979) is an American actor, producer, and writer who has appeared on television shows such as Homeland, Hawaii Five-0, Steven Spielberg and Jason Blum's The River, the CBS series Scorpion, and the Titmouse, Inc. animated series Little Big Awesome, where he voiced multiple characters.

In 2011, Galfer captured the recurring role of Sammy Kirsch in ABC's The River.  A few years later, he landed the recurring role of Dr. Quincy Berkstead  - the annoying, psychologist husband of Amy Berkstead (played by Shooter star Shantel VanSanten)  and hated nemesis of Toby Curtis (played by American Pie film series star Eddie Kaye Thomas in the CBS series Scorpion.

During this time, Galfer raised $25,000 on Kickstarter to produce his first, short film Buried Treasure directed by longtime TV actress and director Leslie Hope.  The film starred a number of recognizable folks including Eloise Mumford, Gregg Henry, and Crista Flanagan. 

In 2016, Galfer (along with his creative partners Sky Soleil and Andrew Fleischer) created the absurdist web series Jeff's Place, which was accepted as a finalist to the independent pilot competition at Denver's Seriesfest  and to the New York Television Festival (NYTVF) pilot competition, where Galfer won Best Actor in a Comedy and the show's director/editor Kent Lamm won Best Editor. 

Shortly after, Galfer was recognized as an Alumni Legend of Barrington High School (Illinois), where he attended school and participated heavily in the theater department in the late 1990's.

Galfer helmed the La Quinta How To Win @ Business campaigns and the 1893 Pepsi-Cola Company campaigns, where he played an irreverent, soda sommelier.  The 1893 campaign ultimately drew strong praise for its marketing success.

Personal life
Galfer was born in Barrington, Illinois, a suburb of Chicago. He graduated from the University of Evansville in Indiana and went to American Conservatory Theater where he obtained a graduate degree in acting. He is married to Los Angeles based interior designer Cody Elderkin.

Filmography

Film

Television

References

External links

Living people
People from Barrington, Illinois

American male stage actors
American male television actors

21st-century American male actors
University of Evansville alumni
American Conservatory Theater alumni

1979 births